Bread & Butter is the debut album by The Newbeats and was released in 1964.  It reached #56 on the Billboard 200.

Four singles were released from the album with three of the singles charting in the United States: "Bread and Butter" reached #2, "Everything's Alright" reached #16, and "Thou Shalt Not Steal" reached #128.

Track listing
 "Bread and Butter" – 1:58 (Larry Parks/Jay Turnbow)
 "Bye Bye Love" – 2:53 (Felice and Boudleaux Bryant)
 "The Shoop Shoop Song (It's in His Kiss)" – 2:05 (Rudy Clark)
 "There Oughta Be a Law (Bout the Stuff I Saw)" – 2:20 (Louis "Dean" Mathias/Marcus F. Mathis/Tress Redmon)
 "So Fine" – 2:25 (Johnny Otis)
 "Pink Dally Rue" – 1:57 (Don Gant/Norris Wilson)
 "Everything's Alright" – 2:10 (John D. Loudermilk)
 "A Patent on Love" – 2:03 (Larry Henley)
 "I'm Blue (The Gong Gong Song)" – 2:17 (Ike Turner)
 "Tough Little Buggy" – 2:23 (Dave Allen)
 "Thou Shalt Not Steal" – 1:59 (Loudermilk)
 "Ain't That Lovin' You Baby" – 1:50 (Jimmy Reed)

Charts

Singles

References

1964 debut albums